The UIM Class 1 World Powerboat Championship (also known as Class 1) is an international motorboat racing competition for powerboats organized by the Union Internationale Motonautique (UIM). It is the premier class of offshore powerboat racing in the world.

Class 1 is considered one of the most spectacular marine motorsports. A Class 1 race-boat has twin inboard 1100hp engines and can reach speeds in excess of 257 km/h (160 mph).  All boats are limited by a minimum weight of 4950 kg.

The sport of powerboat racing has undergone unprecedented changes since the earliest recorded race in 1887 in Nice, France,  organized by the Paris Sailing Club. The French also claimed the next two recorded races in 1903, a 62-mile race in Meulan on the River Seine organized by the Poissy Sailing Club and a 230-mile race from Paris to Trouville. But the first officially recognized international offshore powerboat race was a 22-mile event from Calais, France to Dover, England.

The modern-era of offshore powerboat racing was kick-started on 6 May 1956 with the first running of the famous Miami-Nassau race, which would ultimately lead to the introduction of the Sam Griffith Memorial Trophy and a UIM sanctioned World Championship in 1964. From 1964 to 1976 the winner of the World Championship was decided by points gained from multiple races held at venues around the world. From 1977 to 1991 the winner was decided by series of races at a single event at the end of the year. The World Championship reverted to a multi-event format in 1992.

As of 2019, APBA sanctioned Class One racing is being held by Powerboat P1 under the name Class One USA, with catamarans racing strictly regulated sterndrive Mercury Racing 9.0L 1100 hp twin turbocharged V8 motors, and unlimited power for mono-hulls. The Victory team from the UAE is the current defending championship team.

History

The Boats
Weighing in at around 5 tonnes, each catamaran in the Class 1 fleet is approximately 12-14m in length, 3.5m wide, and constructed using composite materials.

Over the years, safety has become a key concern and today's Class 1 boats are the safest they have ever been.

Inside the cockpit, satellite GPS systems, trim indicators, engine data dashboards and instrument panels and warning lights keep the crew aware of the boat's progress during a race.

The cockpit is reinforced to withstand enormous impacts that may occur if a boat crashes at speeds in excess of 150 mph, with an escape hatch in the hull as an added safety feature in the event of an accident.

While a Class 1 race-boat is highly technical and state-of-the-art, and its overall performance is dependent on design, aero and hydro dynamics, choice of propeller and gear ratio selection, the relationship between driver and throttle-man, who navigate and control the power, must provide direct input to adjust trim and drive settings during a race or official qualifying, is ultimately the defining factor and crucial to performance.

The Crews
Each boat has a two-man crew; the driver who navigates and steers the boat and a throttle-man who dictates the speed by controlling the throttles and the trim.

It is a combination that requires total trust – imagine driving a car and the person beside you has control of the accelerator – and a close working relationship. Spectators may imagine that the crew simply jump into the cockpit, and it's the guys who drive quickest that can win. A simple enough theory, but one that doesn't take into account the skills and professionalism of pilots who regularly hurtle across the waves at over 160 mph/250kmh.

Both pilots work closely with their pit crews to determine the race set-up: the type of propeller required for the conditions, gear ratio settings’, the amount of fuel needed and race tactics.  Propeller choice is critical and can win or lose not only a race, but also a championship.

The Championship
A Class 1 season consists of a series Grands Prix, made up of three official practice sessions, one official qualifying session which is also known as Pole Position and two races. The results of each race are combined to determine the winner of the World Championship. The European Championship and the Middle East Championship are defined by specific events in those geographic regions. The results in official qualifying determine the winner of the Pole Position Championship.

Eight races at four venues make up the UIM Class 1 World Powerboat Championship, with races run over approximately 55 or 75 Nm of multiple laps of approximately 5 Nm (including one or two mandatory long laps).

The World Championship is awarded to the team with the most accumulated points throughout the season. A winning crew collects 20 points, the runners-up 15, with the third-placed team awarded 12 points.

A Grand Prix weekend is run over three days, with registration, technical scrutineering and the first practice session and driver briefings taking place on day one.

On day two a practice session is run in the morning, followed immediately by the Edox Pole Position (qualifying), also counting as a separate championship, and Race 1 in the afternoon.

The Edox Pole Position, like the practice sessions, is run over the Grand Prix course, giving the crews a further opportunity to familiarize themselves with circuits and conditions, and to decide on set-up.  It acts as the qualifier for the line-up for Race 1, with the Pole-sitter (fastest time) lining-up closest to the official start boat. The Edox Pole Position lasts for 45 minutes, with teams having to complete a minimum of one timed lap and allowed to return to the wet pits to make adjustments to set-up, but limited to a total of 10 minutes under the crane.

On day three, a final practice session in the morning is followed in the afternoon by Race 2.  Each race is started by a Nor-Tech 3600 supercat official pace boat, running at a controlled speed, which lead the boats from the wet pits and into a line-abreast under a yellow flag or amber flashing light, a green flag denoting the race start, with the finishing order of the Edox Pole Position dictating the line-up of the boats for Race 1 and the finishing order of Race 1, the start order for Race 2.

Each race consists of approximately 11–15 laps and is 55–75 Nm in length, including one or two mandatory long laps.

Winners

References

Class 1